Maurice Lurot (born 13 April 1940) is a retired French middle-distance runner. He competed in the 800 m event at the 1964 Summer Olympics, but failed to reach the final. His personal best in the 800 m is 1:47.2 (1966). His wife Michèle also competed in sprint events at the 1964 Games.

References

1940 births
Living people
French male middle-distance runners
Olympic athletes of France
Athletes (track and field) at the 1964 Summer Olympics
People from Charleville-Mézières
Sportspeople from Ardennes (department)
20th-century French people
21st-century French people